John Crittenden is the name of:

 John Crittenden, Sr. (1754–1809), veteran of the American Revolutionary War and member of the Virginia House of Burgesses
 John J. Crittenden (1787–1863), US Senator, Governor of Kentucky, Attorney General of the United States and author of the Crittenden Compromise
 John J. Crittenden (soldier) (1854–1876), soldier killed at the Battle of the Little Bighorn